Mercedes Simone (April 21, 1904, Villa Elisa, Buenos Aires - October 2, 1990) was an Argentinian singer and actress, known as "La Dama del Tango" ("The Lady of Tango").

Filmography
 ¡Tango! (1933)
  (1936)
 La vuelta de Rocha (1937)
 Ambición (1939)
 La otra y yo (1949)

1904 births
1990 deaths
21st-century Argentine women singers
Argentine film actresses
People from Buenos Aires Province
20th-century Argentine actresses